The Solihull Metropolitan Borough Council elections were held on Thursday, 4 May 1995, with one third of the council to be elected. The council remained under no overall control with the Conservative and Independent Ratepayer and Residents coalition continuing. Voter turnout was 36.2%.

Election result

|- style="background-color:#F9F9F9"
! style="background-color: " |
| Independent Ratepayers & Residents 
| align="right" | 2
| align="right" | 0
| align="right" | 0
| align="right" | 0
| align="right" | 11.8
| align="right" | 6.4
| align="right" | 3,577
| align="right" | +0.4%
|-

This result had the following consequences for the total number of seats on the council after the elections:

Ward results

|- style="background-color:#F6F6F6"
! style="background-color: " |
| colspan="2"   | Independent Ratepayers hold 
| align="right" | Swing
| align="right" | -5.0
|-

|- style="background-color:#F6F6F6"
! style="background-color: " |
| colspan="2"   | Independent Ratepayers hold 
| align="right" | Swing
| align="right" | +6.4
|-

References

1995 English local elections
1995
1990s in the West Midlands (county)